Charles Edward Baker (born September 26, 1957) is a former professional American football player who played linebacker for eight seasons for the St. Louis Cardinals.

References

1957 births
Living people
American football linebackers
New Mexico Lobos football players
St. Louis Cardinals (football) players
People from Mount Pleasant, Texas